Osee Yee is a studio album by Ghanaian Afro rock band Osibisa released in 2009 by Golden Stool Records – GSTOCD 002. It includes a rendition of George Harrison's song "My Sweet Lord"  that's given an Osibisa funk spin. The back cover calls this an Osibisa Fourth Generation album.

Track listing

Personnel
Teddy Osei – tenor and soprano saxophones, flute, African drums, vocals
Mac Tontoh – trumpet, flugelhorn
Kwame Yeboah – congas, drums, acoustic guitar, keyboards
Kofi Ayivor - congas, percussion
Emmanuel Rentzos – organ, vocals
Colin Graham – trumpet
Alfred Kari Bannerman – lead guitar
Phil Dawson – guitars
Alex Kwaku-Boateng – keyboards, drums
José Joyette – drums
Emmanuel Afram – bass guitar
Idris Rokhman – tenor saxophone
Gregg Kofi Brown – vocals
Nana Yaa – vocals

Credits
Producer – Kwame Yeboah
Osibisa logo - Roger Dean
Cover painting – Freyja Dean

References
All information gathered from several sources for the album Osee Yee (Copyright © 2009 Golden Stool Records – GSTOCD 002).
Allmusic 
Prog Archives 

2009 albums
Osibisa albums